Sean Thomas Casey (born July 2, 1974), nicknamed "The Mayor," is a former Major League Baseball first baseman for the Cleveland Indians, Cincinnati Reds, Pittsburgh Pirates, Detroit Tigers, and Boston Red Sox. Casey was selected to the Major League Baseball All-Star Game three times during his career. He is currently a broadcaster and commentator for the MLB Network.

Early life
Born in Willingboro, New Jersey, as the son of Joan and Jim Casey, Sean Casey and his family moved to Upper St. Clair when he was a child. Casey attended Upper St. Clair High School near Pittsburgh, Pennsylvania, and graduated from the University of Richmond, where he was a member of the Sigma Phi Epsilon fraternity.

As a freshman at the University of Richmond in 1993, Casey had a .386 batting average, a .447 on-base percentage (OBP), and a .526 SLG, with two home runs. He was named a freshman All-American and second team All-Colonial Athletic Association (CAA).

As a sophomore in 1994, Casey batted .371 with a .656 SLG, 13 home runs, and 57 RBI. He was named first team All-CAA. Following his sophomore season at Richmond, Casey played collegiate summer baseball for the Brewster Whitecaps of the Cape Cod Baseball League (CCBL), where he batted .338 with one home run and 30 RBIs, and was named a league all-star. In 2003, he was inducted into the CCBL Hall of Fame.

In the 1995 season as a junior, Casey hit for a .461 batting average to lead all Division I players. Casey was again named first team All-CAA and won the CAA Player of the Year. He was also named a Second Team All-American and ECAC Player of the Year while becoming the first player to ever win the CAA Triple Crown.

Baseball career

Cleveland Indians
After the Cleveland Indians selected first baseman David Miller with their first round selection, the Indians chose Casey in the second round (53rd overall) of the 1995 MLB draft.

Casey began his professional career with the Watertown Indians of the Class A-Short Season New York–Penn League, where he batted .329 with two home runs. He was promoted to the Kinston Indians of the Class A-Advanced Carolina League to begin the 1996 season. He hit .331 with twelve home runs for Kinston.

Casey started 1997 with the Akron Aeros of the Class AA Eastern League. On June 18, the Indians promoted Casey to the Buffalo Bisons of the Class AAA American Association after batting .386 with 19 doubles, 10 home runs and 66 RBI in 62 games with Akron. In 20 games with Buffalo, Casey hit five home runs and 18 RBI. On September 12, Casey was promoted to the Cleveland Indians as a September call-up. He appeared in six games for the Indians, going 2-for-10 (.200) with two walks and an RBI. Casey won the Lou Boudreau Award as the Cleveland Indians' top minor-league position player, at the conclusion of the 1997 season.

Baseball America named him the #20 prospect before the 1998 season.

Cincinnati Reds

1998 season

On March 30, 1998, Casey was traded to the Cincinnati Reds for Dave Burba. On April 3, 1998, Casey was hit in the eye with a ball thrown by teammate Damian Jackson during batting practice, resulting in a fractured orbital, and subsequent surgery. Casey's surgery took two surgeons, operating for four hours to fix his fracture. Just three weeks after the surgery, Casey began his rehab assignment with the Indianapolis Indians, and just a week after joining the Indians, he was recalled to the Reds. Casey struggled during his first season with the Reds, his average dipped to .133, and he was sent back to Indianapolis. On June 18, Casey was recalled to the Reds.

1999 season
On May 19, 1999, the Reds defeated the Colorado Rockies in a 24−12 final, tied for the fourth-highest run-scoring output in MLB history. Casey hit two of the Reds' six home runs, and reached base seven times with four hits and three walks. He also scored five runs and drove in six.  He was selected to the All-Star Game for the first time in 1999.  Casey produced a breakout offensive season in 1999, batting .332 with 25 home runs, 99 runs batted in (RBI), 42 doubles, and 103 runs scored in 151 games.  He was fourth in the National League in batting and doubles, and sixth in singles. In 1999, he won the Hutch Award.

During his tenure in Cincinnati, and later in Pittsburgh and Detroit, Sean Casey was regarded as approachable and friendly, and his nickname, "the Mayor," comes from his reputation for chatting casually with every runner who makes it to first base, and from his very public charity work. It was frequently expanded to "the Mayor of Riverfront" when the Reds played at Riverfront Stadium. On May 16, 2007, Casey was voted in 2007 as "the friendliest player in baseball" by fellow players in a Sports Illustrated poll. He garnered 46% of the vote with the second place vote being split between Jim Thome and Mike Sweeney with only 7% each. Casey was also regarded as among the slowest-running players in the game, grounding into 27 double plays in the 2005 season. This tied him with A. J. Pierzynski for the record of most grounding in double plays by a National League left-handed batter in a season.

Pittsburgh Pirates
On December 8, 2005, Casey was traded to his hometown Pittsburgh Pirates for left-handed pitcher Dave Williams. On April 14, 2006, Casey left a game against the Chicago Cubs after suffering two fractures of the transverse process in his lower left back. He was placed on the disabled list on April 15. After a rehab assignment with the Altoona Curve, Casey returned to the Pirates lineup. During an injury plagued 59-game tenure for the Pirates, Casey hit .296 with three home runs and 29 RBI.

Detroit Tigers

On July 31, 2006, Casey was traded to the Detroit Tigers for minor league pitcher Brian Rogers. During the 2006 American League Championship Series against the Oakland Athletics, he partially tore his left calf muscle in Game 1. After coming back from his torn calf in Game 2 of the World Series, Casey became the hottest hitter for the Tigers, belting two home runs and batting .432 in five games. His .432 batting average was one of the best in Tigers' postseason history.

Casey has been active in Big Brothers and Make-A-Wish Foundation, as well as the "Casey's Crew" program, where he provided free high-priced tickets to disadvantaged youth. Casey credits his Christian upbringing in Pittsburgh's affluent Upper St. Clair suburb for his generosity.

After being told by Dave Dombrowski and Jim Leyland that he would not be re-signed, Casey still praised Mike Ilitch, Dombrowski, and Jim Leyland for giving him the opportunity to come play for Detroit. Casey said "They let me know. I've had a great time with this team, the greatest year and a half of my career. It was great. But I understand the situation."

Boston Red Sox
On February 5, 2008, the Boston Red Sox announced they had signed Casey to a one-year deal. On April 9, 2008, Red Sox third baseman Mike Lowell injured his thumb and was then placed on the DL, first baseman Kevin Youkilis was moved to third, and Casey stepped in as the starting first baseman and exploded by making some good defensive plays and hitting .318 with five RBIs in his first seven games despite missing games in Japan due to a stiff neck he received during the 18-hour flight. He was on the disabled list from April 26 through May 12, and returned as a significant part-time player, finishing the regular season with a .773 OPS on 199 at-bats in 69 games.

Casey was suspended by the MLB for three games after his actions in the Coco Crisp–James Shields brawl.

Casey announced his retirement on January 25, 2009, at the age of 34, having played 12 seasons of Major League Baseball. He currently serves as a baseball analyst for MLB Network. On July 3, 2009, he sat in for Red Sox color commentator Jerry Remy, calling the first game for his old team.

On January 14, 2011, the Reds announced that Casey would do color commentary for 15 telecasts on Fox Sports Ohio during the 2011 season.

On June 23, 2012, Casey was inducted into the Cincinnati Reds Hall of Fame and Museum.

Career statistics

In 12 postseason games (2006, 2008), Casey batted .410 (16-for-39) with three runs, two home runs and 9 RBI.

Awards and accomplishments
 National League All-Star, 1999, 2001, 2004
 Hutch Award, 1999 given to the player who personifies the spirit, courage and integrity of former manager Fred Hutchinson.
 Inducted into the University of Richmond, Department of Athletics Hall of Fame in 2003.

With Conan O'Brien, Casey is a founder of Labels Are For Jars, an innovative anti-hunger organization based in Lawrence, Massachusetts.

In a May 16, 2007, Sports Illustrated Player's Poll, Casey won the distinction of being considered the "friendliest player in baseball", after winning 46% of the votes. 464 MLB players participated in the survey. Hal McCoy, a Cincinnati Reds beat writer for 35 years, has said, "There's no debate, and there never will be a debate. Sean Casey is the nicest guy in professional baseball. Ever."

On August 26, 2008, Casey was inducted into the Irish American Baseball Hall of Fame.

On January 29, 2009, Casey was inducted into the Kinston Professional Baseball Hall of Fame.

Casey was inducted to the Cincinnati Reds Baseball Hall of Fame (along with Dan Driessen and John Reilly) on June 23, 2012.

In 2014, Casey was inducted into the Virginia Sports Hall of Fame.

Broadcasting career
Casey is an analyst appearing across MLB Network's programming, including Emmy Award-winning flagship studio show MLB Tonight, the Spring Training series 30 Clubs in 30 Days, the kids-focused weekly interview and demonstration show Play Ball and MLB Network's special event coverage throughout the year.

References

External links

Sean Casey MLB Network Bio

1974 births
Living people
Akron Aeros players
Altoona Curve players
Baseball players from New Jersey
Boston Red Sox players
Buffalo Bisons (minor league) players
Cincinnati Reds announcers
Cincinnati Reds players
Cleveland Indians players
Detroit Tigers players
Indianapolis Indians players
Kinston Indians players
Louisville Bats players
Major League Baseball broadcasters
Major League Baseball first basemen
MLB Network personalities
National League All-Stars
Pawtucket Red Sox players
People from Willingboro Township, New Jersey
Pittsburgh Pirates players
Richmond Spiders baseball players
Sportspeople from Burlington County, New Jersey
Upper St. Clair High School alumni
Watertown Indians players
Baseball players from Pennsylvania
Brewster Whitecaps players